Candalides silicea is a species of butterfly of the family Lycaenidae. It was described by Henley Grose-Smith in 1894. It is found in the Schouten Islands and Mefor Island in New Guinea.

References

Candalidini
Butterflies described in 1894